Heterodoxa fatuhivae is a species of ulidiid or picture-winged fly in the genus Heterodoxa of the family Tephritidae.

References

Ulidiidae